The Iași Conference, historically known as the Jassy Conference, was a gathering of anti-Bolshevik political figures that met in Iași, the temporary capital of Romania at the time from November 16 through December 6, 1918. The conference was organized by Emile Henno from the French consulate in Kyiv. The objective was to coordinate the anti-Bolshevik movements of Southern Russia in order to facilitate dealings with the Allied powers. The twenty-one delegates could not reconcile their differences, despite the need to be unified before the Allies in requesting aid. The conference did nothing to forward any agreements. The Iași Conference, however, did agree on two points: the desirability of Allied intervention in the civil war and the indivisibility of Russia. In a vote, no candidate for future ruler of Russia could even garner half the votes – General Denikin had the most with nine.

The Volunteer Army was represented by Vasily Shulgin and Grishin-Almazov. The State Unity Council of Russia was represented by Vladimir Gurko and N. N. Shebeko.  Also present were representative of the National Center, made up of Kadet's, and the leftist Union for Regeneration from Kiev.

See also
Romania during World War I

References

Russian Empire in World War I
Russian Civil War
Allied intervention in the Russian Civil War
History of Iași
1918 conferences
1918 in Russia
1918 in Romania